Triple Crown is a combination of three major races in harness racing. The term Triple Crown is mostly used in the US, but also in France. The term is also used in thoroughbred racing.

United States 
The Triple Crown of Harness Racing for Trotters consists of the following horse races:
Hambletonian, held at the Meadowlands Racetrack in East Rutherford, New Jersey
Yonkers Trot, held at Yonkers Raceway in Yonkers, New York
Kentucky Futurity, held at The Red Mile in Lexington, Kentucky

Since its inauguration in 1955, there have been nine winners of the Trotting Triple Crown. They are:

France 
In french harness racing, a Triple Crown consists of the following horse races:

 Prix d'Amérique
 Prix de France
 Prix de Paris

All races is held at Hippodrome de Vincennes in Paris. Winning all three races under the same winter meeting, gets a Triple Crown and a bonus on 300 000 euro. Since its inauguration, there have been four winners of a French Triple Crown. The trotter Gelinotte won the Triple Crown two years in a row.

References

External links
 New Jersey Horse Enthusiast Web
 The Harness Triple Crown Trophies for both Pacing and Trotting

Harness racing in the United States
Harness racing in France
Racing series for horses